Melodryas is a genus of moths belonging to the family Tineidae. It contains only one species, Melodryas doris, which is found on the Solomon Islands.

The wingspan is 20–21 mm. The forewings are elongate and purplish-black with a broad orange transverse fascia.

References

Tineidae
Monotypic moth genera
Moths of Oceania
Tineidae genera
Taxa named by Edward Meyrick